"The Gospel according to Mark" (originally in Spanish "El Evangelio según Marcos") is a short story by the Argentine writer and poet Jorge Luis Borges. It is one of the stories in the short story collection Doctor Brodie's Report (originally in Spanish El informe de Brodie), first published in 1970.

References

External links
 The Gospel according to Mark and El Evangelio según Marcos (an English translation and the Spanish original)
 The Gospel according to Mark (read by Paul Theroux; New Yorker podcast)

1970 short stories
Short stories by Jorge Luis Borges